The following outline is provided as an overview of and topical guide to Jordan:

Jordan – country located in Southwest Asia, bordering Syria to the north, Iraq to the north-east, Israel and the Palestinian territories to the west, and Saudi Arabia to the east and south. It shares the coastlines of the Dead Sea with Israel and the Gulf of Aqaba with Israel, Saudi Arabia and Egypt. Jordan is a constitutional monarchy with representative government. The reigning monarch is the head of state, the chief executive and the commander-in-chief of the armed forces. The king exercises his executive authority through the prime ministers and the Council of Ministers, or cabinet. The cabinet, meanwhile, is responsible before the elected House of Deputies which, along with the House of Notables (Senate), constitutes the legislative branch of the government. The judicial branch is an independent branch of the government.

Increasing Urbanization 

Jordan's population became significantly urbanized during the sixties, reaching a rate of urbanization of over 80% in 2011. This is due to  Rural to urban migration,  the arrival of refugees from Palestine and Syria, and displaced persons who mostly settled in camps and services of UNRWA.

General reference

 Pronunciation:AL URDON
 Common English country name:  Jordan
 Official English country name: The Hashemite Kingdom of Jordan.
 Common endonym(s):  
 Official endonym(s):  
 Adjectival(s): Jordanian
 Demonym(s):
 Etymology: Name of Jordan
 International rankings of Jordan
 ISO country codes:  JO, JOR, 400
 ISO region codes:  See ISO 3166-2:JO
 Internet country code top-level domain:  .jo

Geography of Jordan 

Geography of Jordan
 Jordan is: an Arab country
 Location:
 Northern Hemisphere and Eastern Hemisphere
 Eurasia
 Asia
 Southwest Asia
 Middle East
 The Levant
 Time zone:  UTC+02, summer UTC+03
 Extreme points of Jordan
 High:  Jabal Umm ad Dami 
 Low:  Dead Sea  – lowest point on the surface of the Earth
 Land boundaries:  1,635 km
 744 km
 375 km
 238 km
 181 km
 97 km
 Coastline:  Gulf of Aqaba 26 km
 Population of Jordan: 5,924,000  - 104th most populous country

 Area of Jordan: 89,342 km2
 Atlas of Jordan

Environment of Jordan 

 Climate of Jordan
 Renewable energy in Jordan
 Geology of Jordan
 Protected areas of Jordan
 Biosphere reserves in Jordan
 National parks of Jordan
 Wildlife of Jordan
 Fauna of Jordan
 Birds of Jordan
 Mammals of Jordan
 Nature reserves
 Jordan Radioactive Storage Facility

Natural geographic features of Jordan 

 Glaciers of Jordan
 Islands of Jordan
 Lakes of Jordan
 Mountains of Jordan
 Volcanoes in Jordan
 Rivers of Jordan
 Waterfalls of Jordan
 Valleys of Jordan
 World Heritage Sites in Jordan

Regions of Jordan 

Regions of Jordan

Ecoregions of Jordan 

List of ecoregions in Jordan
 Ecoregions in Jordan

Administrative divisions of Jordan 

Administrative divisions of Jordan

Governorates of Jordan 

Governorates of Jordan

Nahias of Jordan 

Nahias of Jordan

Municipalities of Jordan 

Municipalities of Jordan
 Capital of Jordan: Amman
 Cities of Jordan

Demography of Jordan 

Demographics of Jordan

Government and politics of Jordan 

Government of Jordan
 Form of government: parliamentary representative democratic constitutional monarchy
 Capital of Jordan: Amman
 Elections in Jordan
 Political parties in Jordan

Branches of the government of Jordan 

Government of Jordan

Executive branch of the government of Jordan 
 Head of state: Abdullah II, King of Jordan
 Head of government: Awn Shawkat Al-Khasawneh, Prime Minister of Jordan
 Cabinet of Jordan

Legislative branch of the government of Jordan 

 Parliament of Jordan (bicameral)
 Upper house: Senate of Jordan
 Lower house: Chamber of Deputies of Jordan

Judicial branch of the government of Jordan 

Court system of Jordan
 Supreme Court of Jordan

Foreign relations of Jordan 

Foreign relations of Jordan
 Diplomatic missions in Jordan
 Diplomatic missions of Jordan

International organization membership 
Jordan is a member of:

African Union/United Nations Hybrid operation in Darfur (UNAMID)
Afro-Asian Rural Development Organization (AARDO)
Anna Lindh Euro-Mediterranean Foundation for the Dialogue Between Cultures
Arab Atomic Energy Agency (AAEA)
Arab Authority for Agricultural Investment and Development (AAAID)
Arab Bank for Economic Development in Africa (ABEDA)
Arab Board of Health specializations
Arab Civil Aviation Commission (ACAC)
Arab Confederation of Physical Therapy (ACPT)
Arab Federation for Wildlife Protection (AFWP)
Arab Federation of Exchanges
Arab Fund for Economic and Social Development (AFESD)
Arab Industrial Development and Mining Organization (AIDMO)
Arab Information and Communication Technologies Organization(AICTO)
Arab Institute for Training and Research in Statistics (AITRS)
Arab Inter-parliamentary Union
Arab Labor Organisation (ALO)
Arab League (AL)
Arab League Educational, Cultural and Scientific Organization (ALECSO)
Arab Monetary Fund (AMF)
Arab Organization of Supreme Audit Institutions (ARABOSAI)
Arab Organization for Agricultural Development (AOAD)
Arab Organization of Disabled People
Arab Planning Institute (API)
Arab Sea Ports Federation (ASPF)
Arab States Broadcasting Union
Arab Towns Organization
Asian–African Legal Consultative Organization (AALCO)
Asian Organization of Supreme Audit Institutions (ASOSAI)
Council of Arab Economic Unity (CAEU)
Comprehensive Nuclear-Test-Ban Treaty Organization (CTBTO)
Energy Regulators Regional Association (ERRA)
European Bank for Reconstruction and Development (EBRD)
Federation of Arab News Agencies (FANA)
Food and Agriculture Organization (FAO)
General Arab Insurance Federation (GAIF)
General Union of Chambers of Commerce, Industry and Agriculture for Arab Countries
Group of 77 (G77)
Inter-Parliamentary Union (IPU)
International Atomic Energy Agency (IAEA)
International Bank for Reconstruction and Development (IBRD)
International Centre for Settlement of Investment Disputes (ICSID)
International Chamber of Commerce (ICC)
International Civil Aviation Organization (ICAO)
International Confederation of Free Trade Unions (ICFTU)
International Criminal Court (ICCt)
International Criminal Police Organization (Interpol)
International Development Association (IDA)
International Federation of Surveyors (FIG)
International Federation of Red Cross and Red Crescent Societies (IFRCS)
International Finance Corporation (IFC)
International Fund for Agricultural Development (IFAD)
International Islamic Council for Da'wah and Relief (IICDR)
International Labour Organization (ILO)

International Maritime Organization (IMO)
International Monetary Fund (IMF)
International Olympic Committee (IOC)
International Organization for Migration (IOM)
International Organization for Standardization (ISO)
International Organization of Securities Commissions (IOSCO)
International Organization of Supreme Audit Institutions (INTOSAI)
International Red Cross and Red Crescent Movement (ICRM)
International Telecommunication Union (ITU)
International Telecommunications Satellite Organization (ITSO)
International Trade Union Confederation (ITUC)
International Union for Conservation of Nature (IUCN)
International Union for the Protection of New Varieties of Plants (UPOV)
Islamic Development Bank (IDB)
Islamic Educational, Scientific and Cultural Organization (ISESCO)
Multilateral Investment Guarantee Agency (MIGA)
Nonaligned Movement (NAM)
Operation Smile
Organisation of Islamic Cooperation (OIC)
Organization for Security and Cooperation in Europe (OSCE) (partner)
Organisation for the Prohibition of Chemical Weapons (OPCW)
Permanent Court of Arbitration (PCA)
United Nations (UN)
United Nations Commission on International Trade Law (UNCITRAL)
United Nations Conference on Trade and Development (UNCTAD)
United Nations Economic and Social Commission for Western Asia (ESCWA)
United Nations Educational, Scientific, and Cultural Organization (UNESCO)
United Nations High Commissioner for Refugees (UNHCR)
United Nations Industrial Development Organization (UNIDO)
United Nations Interim Administration Mission in Kosovo (UNMIK)
United Nations Mission in Bosnia and Herzegovina (UNMIBH)
United Nations Mission in the Central African Republic and Chad (MINURCAT)
United Nations Mission in Liberia (UNMIL)
United Nations Mission in the Sudan (UNMIS)
United Nations Mission of Observers in Prevlaka (UNMOP)
United Nations Mission of Observers in Tajikistan (UNMOT)
United Nations Observer Mission in Georgia (UNOMIG)
United Nations Operation in Cote d'Ivoire (UNOCI)
United Nations Organization Mission in the Democratic Republic of the Congo (MONUC)
United Nations Relief and Works Agency for Palestine Refugees in the Near East (UNRWA)
United Nations Stabilization Mission in Haiti (MINUSTAH)
United Nations Transitional Administration in East Timor (UNTAET)
Universal Postal Union (UPU)
World Customs Organization (WCO)
World Federation of Trade Unions (WFTU)
World Health Organization (WHO)
World Intellectual Property Organization (WIPO)
World Meteorological Organization (WMO)
World Tourism Organization (UNWTO)
World Trade Organization (WTO)
World Organisation for Animal Health (OIE)

Law and order in Jordan 

Law of Jordan
 Constitution of Jordan
 Crime in Jordan
 Human rights in Jordan
 LGBT rights in Jordan
 Freedom of religion in Jordan
 Law enforcement in Jordan

Military of Jordan 

Military of Jordan
 Command
 Commander-in-chief:
 Ministry of Defence
 Forces
 Army of Jordan
 Navy of Jordan
 Air Force of Jordan
 Royal Special Forces
 His Majesty's Special Security
 Royal Maintenance Corps
 General Intelligence Department
 Public Security Directorate
 King Abdullah Design and Development Bureau
 Military history
 Desert Force
 Arab Legion
 Transjordan Frontier Force
 Military ranks

Local governments in Jordan 

Local governments in Jordan

History of Jordan 

 Military history of Jordan

Culture of Jordan 

Culture of Jordan
 Architecture of Jordan
 Cuisine of Jordan
 Festivals in Jordan
 Languages of Jordan
 Media in Jordan
 National symbols of Jordan
 Coat of arms of Jordan
 Flag of Jordan
 National Anthem of Jordan
 People of Jordan
 Prostitution in Jordan
 Public holidays in Jordan
 Records of Jordan
 Religion in Jordan
 Christianity in Jordan
 Hinduism in Jordan
 Islam in Jordan
 Judaism in Jordan
 Sikhism in Jordan
 World Heritage Sites in Jordan

Art in Jordan 
 Art in Jordan
 Cinema of Jordan
 Literature of Jordan
 Music of Jordan
 Television in Jordan
 Theatre in Jordan

Sports in Jordan 

Sports in Jordan
 Football in Jordan
Jordan at the Olympics

Economy and infrastructure of Jordan 

Economy of Jordan
 Economic rank, by nominal GDP (2007): 100th (one hundredth)
 Agriculture in Jordan
 Banking in Jordan
 Central Bank
 Communications in Jordan
 Internet in Jordan
 Companies of Jordan
Currency of Jordan: Dinar
ISO 4217: JOD
 Economy of Jordan
 Energy in Jordan
 Energy policy of Jordan
 Jordan Atomic Energy Commission
 Oil industry in Jordan
 Mining in Jordan
 Oil shale in Jordan
 Jordan Stock Exchange
 Tourism in Jordan
 Petra world heritage site
 Transport in Jordan
 Airports
 Railways
 Royal Jordanian Airlines
 Aqaba seaport
 Roads in Jordan
 Water supply and sanitation in Jordan

Education in Jordan 

Education in Jordan
Science and technology in Jordan

Health in Jordan 

Health in Jordan
 Health care in Jordan

See also 

Jordan
Index of Jordan-related articles
List of international rankings
List of Jordan-related topics
Member state of the United Nations
Outline of Asia
Outline of geography

References

External links 

 The King of Jordan
 Government of Jordan
 Ministry of Tourism and Antiquities
 Jordan Tourism Board
 Jordan News Agency (Petra)
 
 

Jordan